The 2015 Tour d'Azerbaïdjan was a five-day cycling stage race that took place in Azerbaijan in May 2015, as the fourth edition of the Tour d'Azerbaïdjan. It was rated as a 2.1 event as part of the 2015 UCI Europe Tour. The race included five stages, starting in Baku on 6 May and returning there for the finish on 10 May. The 2014 champion was Ilnur Zakarin (then ), but he was not present to defend his title.

The race was won by Primož Roglič, who won a solo victory on the second stage of the race and went on to defend his lead to the finish. He finished the race 34 seconds ahead of Jasper Ockeloen, with Matej Mugerli third. Roglič's teammate Marko Kump won a stage and the points classification, while  won both the team classification and the mountains classification through Oleksandr Surutkovych. The youth classification was won by František Sisr.

Schedule 

The race included five road stages on consecutive days.

Teams 

25 teams were invited to take part in the race. Four of these were UCI Professional Continental teams, 17 were UCI Continental teams and four were national teams. Each team could enter a maximum of six riders; the total size of the peloton at the beginning of the first stage was 148 riders.

Stages

Stage 1 
6 May 2015 – Baku to Sumgait,

Stage 2 
7 May 2015 – Baku to Ismayilli, '''

Stage 3 
8 May 2015 – Qabala to Qabala,

Stage 4 
9 May 2015 – Qabala to Mingachevir,

Stage 5 
10 May 2015 – Baku to Baku,

Classification leadership table

References

External links 

 

Tour d'Azerbaïdjan
Azerbaidjan
Tour d'Azerbaidjan